The fourth season of the television drama series Wentworth premiered on SoHo in Australia on 10 May 2016. It was executively produced by FremantleMedia's Director of Drama, Jo Porter. The season comprises 12 episodes. Season four picks up four months after the fire at Wentworth.

Plot 
Four months after the fire at Wentworth, Bea and the other inmates have been housed offsite while they wait for construction to be completed. Season four will see Bea battle two formidable enemies. There is Kaz, made so dangerous by her extremist feminist ideology, who regards Bea as the great betrayer to the cause, and Ferguson who is on a mission to exonerate herself – will the walls of Wentworth be enough to protect the Top Dog?

Cast

Regular 
 Danielle Cormack as Bea Smith
 Nicole da Silva as Franky Doyle
 Celia Ireland as Liz Birdsworth
 Shareena Clanton as Doreen Anderson
 Katrina Milosevic as Sue "Boomer" Jenkins
 Robbie Magasiva as Deputy Governor Will Jackson
 Socratis Otto as Maxine Conway
 Tammy Macintosh as Kaz Proctor
 Kate Jenkinson as Allie Novak 
 Bernard Curry as Jake Stewart
 with Kate Atkinson as Governor Vera Bennett
 and Pamela Rabe as Joan Ferguson

Special guest
 Sigrid Thornton as Sonia Stevens

Recurring  
 Libby Tanner as Bridget Westfall
 Ra Chapman as Kim Chang
 Jacquie Brennan as Linda Miles
 Martin Sacks as Derek Channing 
 Sally-Anne Upton as Lucy "Juice" Gambaro
 Hunter Page-Lochard as Shayne Butler
 Luke McKenzie as Nash Taylor
 Charli Tjoe as Tina Mercado
 Steve Bastoni as Don Kaplan
 Maddy Jevic as Lee Radcliffe
 Bessie Holland as Stella Radic
 Sophia Katos as Mel Barrett

Episodes

Production 
On 27 February 2015, it was announced that FremantleMedia had renewed Wentworth for a fourth season, set to air in 2016.

Jo Porter, the Director of Drama at FremantleMedia stated, "Without wanting to give away any specific spoilers from season three, suffice to say it builds to a fabulous crescendo that in turn has given our season four writers a fantastic launch pad to explore what is next for the complex and compelling characters of Wentworth. Our loyal Wentworth fans are not going to be disappointed and I know our amazing cast and crew are going to relish bringing to life these potent stories."

Penny Win, the Head of Drama at Foxtel stated, "All of us at Foxtel and FremantleMedia Australia are extremely proud of Wentworth and the passionate bond the series has forged with drama lovers, starting with our discerning Foxtel subscribers and expanding to captivate audiences around the world."

On 5 November 2015, it was announced that Sigrid Thornton would step through the gates of Wentworth Correctional Centre, becoming the first actress from the original series, Prisoner to play a major re-occurring role in the reimagination. Moreover, she also plays Sonia Stevens, an inmate featured in the original series, albeit played by Tina Bursill.

Of Sigrid's casting, Penny Win stated, "Wentworth'''s fourth season continues the series' finely-honed evolution as a world class contemporary drama which proudly forges its own path, while fearlessly daring to reimagine characters and elements of the iconic Prisoner series. Having Sigrid Thornton sign on to return behind the walls of Wentworth is a casting dream and a wonderful acknowledgement of the work the writing team has put into the creation of Sonia Stevens and our plans for her and all our characters."

Jo Porter stated, "Sigrid was always on the top of our casting wish list – adored and admired by audiences for the strong women she has chosen to portray. From the second Sonia Stevens steps from the brawler, there is an unsettling sense all is not as it may seem. I am sure audiences will relish watching Sonia’s long game play out across season four."

 Reception 
Ratings

 Accolades 

 AACTA Awards
 Won: Best Television Drama Series — Wentworth - Pino Amenta & Jo Porter
 Nominated: Best Lead Actress in a Television Drama — Danielle Cormack
 Nominated: Best Lead Actress in a Television Drama — Pamela Rabe 
 Nominated: Best Direction in a Television Drama or Comedy — Kevin Carlin (for "Seeing Red")
 Won: Best Editing in Television — Ben Joss (for "Prisoner") 
 Australian Writers' Guild Awards
 Nominated: Best Script for a Television Series — Michael Lucas (for "Plan Bea")
 Nominated: Best Script for a Television Series or Miniseries — Pete McTighe (for "Seeing Red") 
 Logie Awards
 Nominated: Most Outstanding Actress — Danielle Cormack
 Nominated: Most Outstanding Supporting Actress — Nicole da Silva
 Nominated: Best Drama Program — Wentworth Nominated: Most Outstanding Drama Series — Wentworth''

Home media

References

External links 
 

2016 Australian television seasons
Wentworth (TV series)